The Convention for the Protection of the Architectural Heritage of Europe (the Grenada Convention) is a legally binding instrument which set the framework for an accurate conservation approach within Europe. For a total of forty three member states of the Council of Europe, the convention's total ratification/accession has reached forty-two countries since it was opened for signature in 1985.  It entered into force on 1 December 1987.

After 30 years of collaboration among member states of the Council of Europe, this convention constitutes an important framework for the safeguarding of the Cultural Heritage of monuments and sites. 

The Convention for the Protection of the Architectural Heritage in Europe, along with the Framework Convention on the Value of Cultural Heritage for Society, Faro and European Convention on the Protection of the Archaeological Heritages, comprise the thrust of cultural heritage protection and development in Europe.

Issues under the convention
The issues addressed in this convention are defined by the following objectives: 

 Support the idea of solidarity and cooperation among European parties, in relation to heritage conservation
 It includes principles of "conservation policies" within the framework of European cooperation
 Strengthen and promote policies for the conservation and development of cultural heritage in Europe

About the convention
The starting point of this convention, mentioned in the preamble, was the European Cultural Convention signed in 1954. After that, the first action toward the protection and safeguarding of cultural heritage promoted by the Parliamentary Assembly of the Council of Europe started in 1963 through the creation of Europa Nostra, which promoted the intergovernmental cooperation within Europe.

Structure

Preamble
The overall aim is first give a cultural references improving their environment in the European context, and secondly fostering a sustainable development considering economic enhancement and social development.
Is stated that European parties, by the accordance of common principles, can commit themselves in a permanent collaboration for conservation policies. This can be seen by the accordance of minimum safeguard agreements regarding architectural heritage.
It is mentioned that in matters of cultural heritage and build heritage, the Council of Europe has been working over 30 years. It expresses the purpose and the European philosophy regarding conservation issues.

Definition of the architectural heritage
It contains the three definition of heritage define by the 1972 Convention for the Protection of the World Cultural and Natural Heritage UNESCO. This comprises the description of monuments, groups of building and sites.

Identification of properties to be protected
This section is composed by Article 2, which establishes the realisation of a survey by the creation of an inventory. This will permit not only the documentation of heritage, define in article 1, but also the assessment of properties as the initial action towards legal protection.

Statutory protection procedures
This part is defined by Article 3, 4 and 5.  It contains the legal, political and administrative measures to be taken by each Party for protecting the properties in question. This measures will be applied differ in each region or State. It also describes in article 4, the legal actions applicable to the protected heritage, that ensure the supervision on work which is affecting protected properties.

Ancillary measures
Composed by Articles 6, 7 and 8. Here explain the types of financial support that public authorities may give to guarantee, facilitate and encourage the maintenance and restoration of protected properties. Also, is mentioned the different measures to consider in respect of the environment, like public spaces and pollution control.

Sanctions
It contains only Article 9, and which explains that Parties may ensure, that infringements of the law protecting the heritage, will have an adequate response by criminal law or administrative law.

Conservation policies
It consists in Article 10, 11, 12 and 13. It describes principles of integrated conservation of the heritage, reflected in the previous work made by the Council of Europe. Also explain the principle for maintenance though the heritage use, describe in previously in Article 5 of the Venice Charter, ICOMOS. It also states that there must be balance between the using and conservation, which will conserve the architectural and historical value of the property. This will be aimed by the principles of integrated conservation explained in article 13, which implies and effective cooperation between the administrative departments concerned.

Participation and associations
It contains Article 14, and describes the establishment of structures to facilitate cooperation between the parties or regions concerned.

Information and training
Contains Article 15 and 16, and explain the importance of public participation in early stage, as a whole to appreciate and understand heritage. This might concerns training systems and trades implicated in conservation.

European co-ordination of conservation policies
Define by the Articles 17, 18, 19, 20 and 21. It can be found in Articles 17 and 18 the description of the coordination of European conservation policies. It describes also the technical assistance system under Council of Europe. Article 19 expresses the desirable exchanges and trade of persons involved in the conservation of the heritage. In Article 20, in order to ensure the successful application of this Convention, is desirable the creation of a committee for monitoring.

Final clauses
This section consist in Articles 22, 23, 24,25, 26 and 27, and which has the Europe Council's final clauses for conventions and agreements.

Parties
Member states of the Council of Europe

See also
 Values (heritage)
 Cultural Heritage Management
 Cultural property law
 List of Council of Europe treaties

References

Further reading
 Convention on the Value of Cultural Heritage for Society
 European Convention on the Protection of the Archaeological Heritage
 Convention Concerning the Protection of the World Cultural and Natural Heritage

External links
 Convention text

Council of Europe treaties
Treaties concluded in 1985
Treaties entered into force in 1987
Treaties of Andorra
Treaties of Armenia
Treaties of Azerbaijan
Treaties of Belgium
Treaties of Bosnia and Herzegovina
Treaties of Bulgaria
Treaties of Croatia
Treaties of Cyprus
Treaties of the Czech Republic
Treaties of Denmark
Treaties of Estonia
Treaties of Finland
Treaties of France
Treaties of Georgia (country)
Treaties of West Germany
Treaties of Greece
Treaties of Hungary
Treaties of Ireland
Treaties of Italy
Treaties of Latvia
Treaties of Liechtenstein
Treaties of Lithuania
Treaties of Luxembourg
Treaties of Malta
Treaties of Moldova
Treaties of Montenegro
Treaties of the Netherlands
Treaties of Norway
Treaties of Poland
Treaties of Portugal
Treaties of Romania
Treaties of Russia
Treaties of Serbia and Montenegro
Treaties of Slovakia
Treaties of Slovenia
Treaties of Spain
Treaties of Sweden
Treaties of Switzerland
Treaties of North Macedonia
Treaties of Turkey
Treaties of Ukraine
Treaties of the United Kingdom
1985 in Spain
Art and culture treaties
Treaties extended to Jersey
Treaties extended to Guernsey
Treaties extended to the Isle of Man
Treaties extended to Gibraltar